is a Japanese bakery based in Hiroshima, Japan. It was the first company of the Andersen Institute of Bread and Life group of companies.

History
The original bakery was founded in Hijiyama-Hon-machi, Hiroshima by Mr. and Mrs. Takaki in August 1948.  was established in December 1951. Bread of Takaki began to operate their new bread factory in Senogawa, Aki-gun, Hiroshima Prefecture in March 1961. In 1962 the bakery was renamed "Takaki Bakery". They opened a restaurant and bakery called "Andersen" in a building bought from Mitsui Bank in Hiroshima in October 1967. The bank building, built in 1925, had been damaged by the atomic bomb blast during World War II. In April 1970 they began to operate a frozen bread factory, and later that year opened another shop called "Aoyama-Andersen" in Aoyama, Tokyo The business eventually expanded to operate shops throughout the Kantō region.

"Hiroshima-Andersen" was visited by Margrethe II of Denmark in April 1981 and by Frederik, Crown Prince of Denmark in November 1987. The company operates a restaurant and bakery in San Mateo, California, opened in 1981, and two bakeries in Copenhagen, Denmark, one of which is located in the famous Tivoli Gardens.

Andersen Group
In addition to Takaki Bakery, the group operates shops under the names Hiroshima Andersen, Aoyama Andersen, ANDERSEN, M's bakery, and bread & hygge. As of 2006, Andersen Group employed 2,428 persons. The US branch of Andersen Bakery is located in Hayward, California.

Origin of name and link to Denmark
The "Andersen" in the companies title (Andersen Bakery/Institute of Bread and Life Co., Ltd.) is in reference to Hans Christian Andersen. The inspiration for making Danish pastries, and 'European style' bread, came from a study trip to Denmark in 1959, by founder Shunsuke Takaki. Seiichi Takaki, president of Andersen Institute of Bread & Life, has further strengthened ties with Denmark by donating 200 Japanese cherry trees to the municipality of Copenhagen. The trees were planted in Langelinie park.

References

External links
 
 Andersen Group
 Andersen Group video profile (English)

Food manufacturers of Japan
Companies based in Hiroshima
Companies based in Hayward, California
Food and drink in the San Francisco Bay Area